Tak Bolagh may refer to:
 Tak Bolagh, Germi
 Tak Bolagh, Meshgin Shahr
 Tak Bolagh, Nir